Alfred Smyth may refer to:

Alfred Smyth (politician) (1879–1959), member of the Legislative Council of Samoa
Alfred P. Smyth (1942–2016), Irish-born historian